Juan Mari Arzak Arratibel (born July 31, 1942) is a Spanish chef, the owner and chef for Arzak restaurant.  He is considered to be one of the great masters of New Basque cuisine.  He describes his cooking as "signature cuisine, Basque cuisine that's evolutionary, investigatory, and avant-garde."

Personal life
Arzak was an only child born to Juan Ramon Arzak and Francisca Arratibel in San Sebastián, Spain.  He spent much of his childhood in his grandparents' restaurant.  Later, Juan Mari Arzak's parents took over control of the restaurant.  Juan Mari Arzak's father died in 1951, after which time his mother continued to run the restaurant until he took over control of the restaurant.  Juan Mari Arzak has two daughters, Marta and Elena, with Maite Espina.

Professional life
Arzak said that his interest in cooking began at birth, and that in his childhood he would help in his family's restaurant.  However, his real interest in cuisine didn't begin until his time at a hotel management school in Madrid.  After Arzak's mandatory time in the military, he returned to his family's restaurant and began training as a chef, during which time he was responsible for roasting meat.  Since he took over the restaurant, the restaurant has garnered much praise, and received 3 Michelin stars in 1989.  In 2008 Arzak received the "Universal Basque" award for "adapting gastronomy, one of the most important traditions of the Basque Country, to the new times and making of it one of the most innovative of the world". He trained his daughter Elena Arzak (1969-), who has won the "Veuve Clicquot World's Best Female Chef" at the "World's 50 Best Restaurant Awards", to take over the restaurant.

External links

 Restaurant Arzak website

Notes

1942 births
Living people
Molecular gastronomy
Spanish chefs
People from San Sebastián
Head chefs of Michelin starred restaurants
Basque cuisine